Kanye West (born 1977) is an American rapper, record producer, and fashion designer.

Kanye may also refer to:

 Kanye (name), a list of people with the name
 Kanye, Botswana, a city in Botswana
 Kanye Airport, an airport serving the town
 "Kanye", a 2014 song by the Chainsmokers featuring SirenXX

See also
 
 
 Kanye West (disambiguation)
 Kayne